The Chairman, Chiefs of Staff Committee (Chairman COSC) is a position in the Indian Armed Forces, usually held by a four-star officer serving as the Chief of Defence Staff (CDS) of the Indian military. The position holder chairs the Chiefs of Staff Committee, and serves as the principal adviser to the prime minister and Minister of Defence. The position is not a statutory office but rather a title held by the senior most serving military officer of India. Until 2020, the chairmanship of the COSC was held in rotation by the senior-most service chief until his retirement, but this arrangement was found to be unsatisfactory. Thus, when the post of the CDS was established, its holder was also made the permanent Chairman COSC.

In the absence of the CDS, a temporary Chairman Chiefs of Staff Committee may be appointed. On 15 December 2021, after the demise of General Bipin Rawat, the then Chief of Defence Staff on 8 December in a plane crash, General Manoj Mukund Naravane was appointed Chairman COSC. He remained in office until his retirement on 30 April 2022, following which the position fell vacant. After four months, Lieutenant General Anil Chauhan (Retired)  was appointed the CDS and permanent Chairman, COSC on 28 September.

History
The Chiefs of Staff Committee was established on 15 August 1947, upon Indian independence, and was conceived as the "supreme professional body" to advise the Minister of Defence and the Cabinet Committee on Political Affairs on all military-related matters. The chairman of the committee was the Commander-in-Chief (Chief of Staff from 1955) of the three armed forces who has been on the committee for the longest. General Sir Robert Lockhart was the first chairman, with General K. M. Cariappa appointed the first Indian chairman on 14 October 1951. The committee was assisted by several sub-committees dealing with specific problems pertaining to administrative, training and planning matters.

Following the end of the Kargil war, Kargil Review Committee found there was a lack of communication between the service branches, and therefore suggested to create the position of Chief of Defence Staff (CDS). This was however rejected by many members of the military, arguing that only great or imperial powers engaging in power projection needed that amount of integration. A compromise was reached with the office of the COSC. The chairman was responsible for inter-service synergy. However, as the Chairman COSC only served as Primus inter pares to the other Chiefs of Staff, he did not wield any power. The chairman was assisted by the Integrated Defence Staff.

Talks concerning the creation of a Chief of Defence Staff position continued for over a decade, along with a suggestion the position of chairman be made permanent, with a renewable two-year term. Both of these suggestions were rejected by the Indian Air Force. In December 2018, however, the Chairman Chiefs of Staff Committee Admiral Sunil Lanba stated the heads of the three services had "finally agreed on a permanent chief of staff committee," and the matter had been sent to the Defence Ministry for consideration.

On Independence Day 2019, Prime Minister Narendra Modi announced the government's decision to make the Chief of Defence Staff the permanent Chairman COSC, with the CDS being a "first among equals" among the service chiefs, who would deal with India's national security with a comprehensive approach, acting as a single-point military adviser to the prime minister and defence minister.

Following the death of the late CDS Bipin Rawat in a helicopter crash in December 2021, the government reverted to the previous system as a stop-gap arrangement and appointed General Manoj Mukund Naravane as Chairman COSC. He remained in office until his retirement on 30 April 2022. The post remained vacant until the appointment of Lieutenant General Anil Chauhan (Retired) as CDS and permanent Chairman, COSC on 28 September.

List of chairmen
† Died in office.

|-style="text-align:center;"
|colspan=8|Vacant 8–15 December 2021

|-style="text-align:center;"
|colspan=8|Vacant 30 April 2022 – 30 September 2022

Gallery

See also
 Chief of Defence Staff
 Chief of the Army Staff
 Chief of the Naval Staff
 Chief of the Air Staff
 Chief of Integrated Defence Staff
 Chief of the General Staff
 Commander-in-Chief of India

Notes

References

Indian Army
Indian Air Force
Indian Navy
Indian military appointments